United Heritage Credit Union is a credit union headquartered in Austin, Texas, chartered and regulated under the authority of the Texas Credit Union Department   and federally insured by the National Credit Union Administration.  United Heritage Credit Union has over $1 billion in assets.

History 
United Heritage Credit Union was founded in 1957 as Military Federal Credit Union offering loans and savings to military personnel.  In 1969, the credit union expanded as Bergstrom Federal Credit Union, at which time it was able to add more services and increase its membership base. In 1989, the credit union merged with Texas Hospital Association Credit Union, Texas National Guard Credit Union and Healthcare Federal Credit Union. Therefore, by 1993, the credit union was able to include hospitals, hospital affiliates and select employer groups (SEGs) to its growing membership base. In that same year the credit union changed its name to United Heritage Federal Credit Union. Then in 1997, the credit union switched from a federal charter to a state charter, officially changing the name to United Heritage Credit Union. 
 
United Heritage has repeatedly been named as one of Austin’s Top 5 Credit Unions by the Austin Business Journal 2019.

In July 2013, United Heritage Credit Union launched an updated website at uhcu.org. Later in 2013, United Heritage competed in a Site of the Year contest organized by Kentico CMS. Sites built on the platform competed against one another in several categories, including Business Services, Consumer Goods, E-Commerce, Education, Financial Services and more. United Heritage competed in the Financial Services category and received the Best Financial Services Site title. The overall title of Site of the Year 2013 was awarded to the Canadian Red Cross website.

In 2015, United Heritage Credit Union made The Financial Brand's list of "Top 100 Credit Unions Using Social Media." That same year, the credit union nabbed a spot on The Financial Brand's list of "25 Inspirational & Responsive Banking Website Designs."

In 2016, the credit union won a number of awards—including a CUNA Diamond Award, Hermes Creative Award, American Business Award and Communicator Award—for its Summer Showtime campaign, an annual social media contest that gives entrants the chance to win tickets to concerts, theme parks and more via entries on Facebook, Instagram and Twitter.

In 2018, United Heritage Credit Union reached $1 Billion in assets.

Branch locations 
Throughout the years, the credit union opened multiple branch locations. There are now 11 United Heritage Credit Union branches in Central Texas and Tyler, Texas. In 1988, it opened the North Austin location off of Mopac Expressway. In 1992, it opened its first branch in Tyler, Texas, which has since moved to a different location in Tyler. The next year, in 1993, it opened a branch in Georgetown, Texas. A few years later, in 1996, it opened a branch off of Manchaca Rd in South Austin, which then received an extensive renovation completed in 2011. In 2004, the credit union opened its Round Rock location and opened its Cedar Park branch in 2006. In 2008, the credit union opened 3 different locations, one in Lakeway, one in Westlake  and one off of Slaughter Lane in Southwest Austin. Then in 2009, the Kyle, Texas, location opened. In 2011, the credit union opened a branch in River Place, a community located west of Austin at RM 2222 and RR 620.

Membership and organization 
United Heritage Credit Union is a state chartered member-owned financial cooperative with branches in the Austin area and Tyler, Texas. The credit union also provides business services, including checking, savings, investments, insurance and commercial loans.

United Heritage Credit Union is a member of the Alliance of Austin Credit Unions   and CO-OP Financial Services and participates as a CU Service Center. United Heritage is currently rated A+ by the Better Business Bureau (BBB).
 
United Heritage Credit Union membership is available to anyone who lives, works, attends school, or has a business located in Bastrop, Bell, Blanco, Burnet, Caldwell, Hays, Lee, Milam, Travis, Williamson, Cherokee, Gregg, Henderson, Rusk, Smith, Upshur, Van Zandt or Wood county. Membership is also available to family members of current members or anyone who works for an employer on the select employer group list as well as those that join or are current members of the Texas Consumer Council (TXCC).

Employees 
United Heritage employs over 200 people in the Austin and Tyler, Texas, areas.

Products and services 
United Heritage Credit Union offers products and services found in many other financial institutions, including savings and checking accounts, multiple types of loan products and several investment products, insurance, as well as online and mobile banking services, including Mobile Deposit and Web BillPay. United Heritage also offers several unique products, including Instant Issue Debit Cards, which are instantly issued debit cards that can be printed in minutes at any full-service UHCU branch location.

References

Credit unions based in Texas
Companies based in Austin, Texas
Banks established in 1957